Jim Roth is an American politician from the Oklahoma. A Democrat, Roth most recently served as one of three members of the Oklahoma Corporation Commission from June 2007 through January 2009, having been appointed by Governor Brad Henry.

Roth is openly gay and was the first ever openly LGBT person to hold a statewide elected office in Oklahoma. In 2011, Republican Governor Mary Fallin attempted to appoint Roth to the Oklahoma State Election Board as the panel's lone Democrat, but his nomination was rejected by the Republican-controlled Senate.

Early life and education 
Born in Prairie Village, Kansas, Roth attended Shawnee Mission East High School, Kansas State University, and Oklahoma City University School of Law. He then went on to work as a Chief Deputy and Attorney to the Oklahoma County Commission and the Oklahoma County Clerk.

Career 
Prior to his statewide positions, Roth had served as an Oklahoma County Commissioner, a post to which he had been elected in 2002 and re-elected in 2006. In his bid to serve out the last two years of the Corporation Commission term to which he had been appointed, Roth was defeated 52%-48% by Republican Dana Murphy.

Roth endorsed the MAPS 3 proposal on the December 8, 2009 ballot in Oklahoma City. Roth is Dean and Professor of Law at Oklahoma City University School of Law.

References

External links 
 Campaign website

1968 births
Living people
People from Prairie Village, Kansas
Politicians from Oklahoma City
Oklahoma City University faculty
County commissioners in Oklahoma
Corporation Commissioners of Oklahoma
Oklahoma Democrats
Kansas State University alumni
Oklahoma City University alumni
Gay politicians
LGBT appointed officials in the United States
LGBT people from Oklahoma